Feriana "Fery" Ferraguzzi (born 20 February 1959) is an Italian football coach and former midfielder, who is currently the technical director of BeNe League club Standard Fémina de Liège.

A box-to-box midfielder, Ferraguzzi won two Serie A titles with SS Lazio in 1979 and 1980 before accepting a transfer offer from Standard Fémina de Liège of 2,000,000 lire plus accommodation.

An administrative error by Lazio meant that Ferraguzzi moved to Standard Fémina with no transfer fee. Lazio complained to FIFA and got her banned from the national team for two years.

Overall, Ferraguzzi was a member of the Italy women's national football team from 1975 until 1993, and scored Italy's first official World Cup goal in 1991. She retired from international football aged 34, after playing in Italy's 1–0 UEFA Women's Euro 1993 final defeat to Norway, and being named Player of the Tournament.

References

External links

1959 births
Living people
Italian women's footballers
Italy women's international footballers
Italian expatriate women's footballers
1991 FIFA Women's World Cup players
Serie A (women's football) players
S.S. Lazio Women 2015 players
Sportspeople from Perugia
Women's association football midfielders
Italian football managers
Women's association football managers
Expatriate women's footballers in Belgium
Standard Liège (women) players
Footballers from Umbria
Italian expatriate sportspeople in Belgium